The Journal of Specialised Translation is a biannual peer-reviewed open access academic journal covering research in specialised, non-literary translation. In addition to articles and reviews, the journal contains video material of interviews with translation scholars and professionals from the translation industry. The Journal is published since 2004 with two issues per year. Since 2007, guest-edited thematic issues alternate with non-thematic issues. The founding member and the chair of the editorial board was Peter Newmark until his death in 2011. The first editor-in-chief was Lucile Desblache of the University of Roehampton from 2003 to 2018. Since December 2018 the Journal is edited by Łucja Biel.

Abstracting and indexing
The journal is included in the Directory of Open Access Journals as well as linked to by specialist directories such as the European Society for Translation Studies' resource list and in the Routledge list of translation journals. It is indexed in Scopus, ERIH PLUS, the MLA International Bibliography, John Benjamins’ Translation Studies Bibliography, and Web of Science (Arts and Humanities Citation Index, Current Contents/Arts & Humanities, Social Sciences Citation Index, Journal Citation Reports/Social Sciences Edition, Current Contents/Social and Behavioral Sciences).

References

 JoSTrans: The Journal of Specialised Translation. Directory of Open Access Journals. Retrieved 2016-05-16.
 JOSTRANS: JOURNAL OF SPECIALISED TRANSLATION. Miar: Information Matrix for the Analysis of Journals. Universitat de Barcelona. Retrieved 2016-05-16.
 Translation Studies Journals. European Society for Translation Studies. Retrieved 2016-05-16.
 Routledge Translation Studies Portal. Routledge. Retrieved 2016-05-16.
 Search. ERIH PLUS. Retrieved 2016-05-16.
 Directory of Periodicals. Modern Language Association. Retrieved 2016-05-16.
 Translation Studies Bibliography. John Benjamins. Retrieved 2016-05-16.

External links

Biannual journals
Publications established in 2004
Academic journals published by universities and colleges
Translation journals